Sounds is the 13th album by Scottish lo-fi band Spare Snare, record and engineered by Steve Albini and released in 2018.

Details 

In February 2018, Spare Snare and Steve Albini presented an Audio Engineers' Workshop at Chem19 Studios in Blantyre, Scotland, after the workshop Spare Snare spent a further 4 days recording 10 songs from their back catalogue. The album and the workshop were both funded by Creative Scotland. It was recorded onto 2 inch tape at 15 inch per second and mixed down to half inch tape at 30 inch per second.

Track listing

Personnel

Spare Snare
 Jan Burnett – vocals, guitar
 Alan Cormack – bass guitar, guitar, backing vocals
 Barry Gibson – drums, backing vocals
 Graeme Ogston – guitar, bass guitar, organ, backing vocals
 Adam Lockhart – guitar, bass guitar, synths, backing vocals

Additional personnel
 Fraser MacInness – Bagpipe drones on "Action Hero"
 Ali Hendry – Trumpet on "Action Hero" and "Grow"
 Dave Burnett – Electric slide guitar on "Grow"
 Emma Pollock – Backing vocals on 'We Are The Snare"
Steve Albini - Recording and engineering

References

2018 albums
Spare Snare albums